Sir Ronald Hibbert Cross, 1st Baronet,  (9 May 1896 – 3 June 1968) was a British politician and diplomat. He served as Governor of Tasmania 1951-58.

Early life and education
Cross was educated at Ludgrove Preparatory School and then Eton College. He served with the Duke of Lancaster's Own Yeomanry and as a pilot with the Royal Flying Corps in World War I.

Career
At the 1931 general election, Cross was elected as Conservative Member of Parliament (MP) for Rossendale. He served successively as government whip (1935), Junior Lord of the Treasury (1937), Vice-Chamberlain of the Household (1937–38) and Parliamentary Secretary to the Board of Trade (1938–39). He was sworn into the Privy Council in 1940.

During the Second World War, Cross served as Minister of Economic Warfare (1939–40) and Minister of Shipping (1940–41). In 1941, he was removed as Minister of Shipping after his performance was criticized by the press. The same year, he was appointed British High Commissioner to Australia and created a Baronet, of Bolton-le-Moors in the County Palatine of Lancaster. Cross returned to the United Kingdom in 1945 but lost his seat at that year's election.

In 1950, Cross was elected in the seat of Ormskirk, Lancashire.
He later served as Governor of Tasmania from 23 August 1951 to 4 June 1958. He was appointed a Knight Commander of the Royal Victorian Order (KCVO) by Queen Elizabeth II when she visited Hobart during her Coronation Tour in 1954. He was later appointed Knight Commander of the Order of St Michael and St George (KCMG) in the 1955 New Year Honours. He was a popular governor, well regarded in the island State.

Cross married Louise Marion Green-Emmott in 1925. They had four daughters and a son who predeceased him.

References

External links
 
 

1896 births
1968 deaths
Baronets in the Baronetage of the United Kingdom
British Army personnel of World War I
Conservative Party (UK) MPs for English constituencies
Duke of Lancaster's Own Yeomanry officers
Governors of Tasmania
High Commissioners of the United Kingdom to Australia
Knights Commander of the Order of St Michael and St George
Knights Commander of the Royal Victorian Order
Members of the Privy Council of the United Kingdom
Ministers in the Churchill wartime government, 1940–1945
Ministry of Economic Warfare
Parliamentary Secretaries to the Board of Trade
People educated at Eton College
Royal Flying Corps officers
UK MPs 1931–1935
UK MPs 1935–1945
UK MPs 1950–1951
Ministers in the Chamberlain wartime government, 1939–1940
Ministers in the Chamberlain peacetime government, 1937–1939
People educated at Ludgrove School